WWE NXT, also known simply as NXT, is an American professional wrestling television program. It is produced by the American professional wrestling promotion WWE, featuring performers from the promotion's NXT brand division. The show currently airs live on Tuesdays at 8 p.m. Eastern Time on the USA Network.

NXT initially debuted in 2010 as a seasonal show which was presented as a hybrid between WWE's scripted live event shows and reality television, in which talent from WWE's developmental territory Florida Championship Wrestling (FCW) participated in a competition to become WWE's next "breakout star", with the help of mentors from WWE's Raw and SmackDown brands. Five seasons of this iteration were broadcast, with Wade Barrett, Kaval, Kaitlyn, and Johnny Curtis as winners.

In June 2012, WWE ended the seasonal competition format and opted to revamp the show as a developmental wrestling program. WWE NXT became the flagship television show of the NXT brand, and has since received a positive reception and high viewership, with praise for its high quality of wrestling and captivating storylines particularly from 2014 to 2018.

The initial version of the show made its debut on Syfy on February 23, 2010, replacing ECW, but was replaced by  SmackDown in October. It then aired as an hourly webcast on WWE.com in the United States until June 13, 2012, before it was expanded to international markets on the WWE Network in 2014. In 2019, NXT expanded into a live two-hour program on the USA Network, airing on Wednesday nights, at the same time as rival promotion All Elite Wrestling's flagship show Dynamite on TNT, before moving to Tuesday nights in April 2021. In September 2021 NXT was revamped and rebranded as NXT 2.0. A supplementary show titled NXT Level Up, began airing on February 18, 2022, replacing 205 Live. In September 2022, "2.0" was dropped from the title.

History

Background
On February 2, 2010, WWE Chairman Vince McMahon introduced a new weekly program that would replace the canceled ECW in its time slot on Syfy. McMahon described the show as "the next evolution of WWE; the next evolution of television history".

The new show's name, NXT, was later discovered to be trademark already in the United Kingdom by National Wrestling Alliance (NWA) affiliate Scottish Wrestling Alliance (SWA) which also used "NXT" as their brand for upcoming stars. Both parties ultimately reached an agreement that resulted in SWA releasing the "NXT" trademark in favor of a new one before the show's debut.

The show's format was revealed in an article by Variety on February 16, with a press release from WWE made shortly later that day. NXT is the second reality-based series produced by WWE, the first being WWE Tough Enough which aired between 2001 and 2004. Due to WWE's nature of airing weekly shows without hiatus, the plan for NXT was to split the year's set of episodes into multiple seasons.

Original format (2010–2012) 

NXT was formed in 2010 when they paired up wrestlers from WWE's developmental territory Florida Championship Wrestling (dubbed "Rookies") with wrestlers from WWE's existing Raw and SmackDown brands (dubbed "Pros"). Each episode featured the rookies being mentored by the pros as they develop their gimmick and performance skills in front of a live audience. The pairings also enabled the show to crossover into WWE's Raw and SmackDown programs. As the length of each season differed, features of the competition occur at different times accordingly. In addition to matches, weekly challenges were held during the competition to further test the Rookies' physical and mental skills.

Past physical challenges include a keg carrying contest, an assault course contest and a "Rock 'Em Sock 'Em" tournament. Past non-physical challenges include making 30-second promos on a given topic and selling programme within a time limit.

During the first two seasons, the winner of the weekly challenge receives a special prize such as a main event match, a talk show segment or a feature on WWE's official website. One of the more frequent prizes given out to the winner is an "Immunity Pass", which gives the holder immunity from elimination in the next round of polls. During the last three seasons a greater emphasis on challenges was placed on the show. Instead of awarding prizes to the winner of the challenges, points are instead awarded to the winner with a cumulative tally of points recorded before each of the first three polls. The Rookie with the most points before the next upcoming poll is awarded immunity. In season three, one point is awarded for winning the challenge.

In October 2010, WWE moved their show SmackDown to Syfy, with NXT leaving the network at the same time. Despite WWE's stated intention of broadcasting the show on another TV channel, NXT began to be aired as a webcast on WWE's website for American visitors.

In season four, the number of points vary on the difficulty of the challenge. In the result of a tie-break, the audience is then asked to vote for the Rookie they want to get immunity. Season four also saw the introduction of challenge matches involving the entire roster of Pros or Rookies where the winner would be given the chance to swap their respective Rookie or Pro for another. In various weeks, polls were held to evaluate the success of each Rookie and determine the winner of the competition. The poll rankings are entirely determined by votes from the Pros and starting from season 2, votes from fans via WWE's official website. In the Pros' votes, each of the Pros vote for their favorite Rookie, but cannot vote for their own Rookie. Their votes are based on the following four criteria:

 Win–loss record within the show
 Strength of opponents
 Work ethic
 "It" factor

Initially, in the first two seasons the full results and rankings from the poll were revealed. However, since August 17, 2010 only the elimination is revealed. The first poll, usually held a third of the way through the competition, determines the Rookies' rankings. Subsequent polls are held several weeks later near the end of the season, where the lowest ranked Rookie without immunity is eliminated. Season 2 was set to use this format, but was changed to have the first poll an elimination poll. Season three also used the second season's format. The show continued until the season finale, where the final two or three Rookies appear. One or two final polls were then held to determine the winner of the competition. The prize for the winner is a WWE contract as well as a championship match at any list of WWE pay-per-view and WWE Network events. Outside of the polls, Rookies could still be eliminated via an executive decision from WWE management, as the first season saw both Daniel Bryan and Michael Tarver eliminated by management for a lack of self-confidence.

Starting in 2012, the all-rookie competition was abandoned with the show now featuring past and present rookies alongside lower cardmembers of the main WWE roster. William Regal would also take over as the authority figure and match coordinator, with Matt Striker being retained as the show's host. On May 30, 2012, it was revealed that a sixth season of NXT under its original format was set to air. The season was supposed to star Big E, Seth Rollins, Damien Sandow, Sin Cara, Bo Dallas and Adam Rose as the season's rookies, but ultimately was cancelled before airing.

Reboot (2012–2019) 

In May 2012, the show's format was revamped. The show began using more talent from FCW as well as talent from the main roster. The first four episodes under the new format were taped at Full Sail University on May 17. Starting with NXT Arrival in February 2014, NXT occasionally aired live episodes on the WWE Network, which effectively serve as the NXT equivalent of main roster pay-per-view shows. WWE continued to air NXT Redemption, hoping a new television deal could be made. WWE.com revealed on June 13 that the new version of NXT would be made available online via WWE.com and YouTube beginning on Wednesday, June 20, when WWE would begin airing the episodes they taped at Full Sail on May 17. However, WWE removed all of the NXT material from their website on June 19. NXT was then aired exclusively on Hulu and Hulu Plus in the United States while continuing to be broadcast internationally. NXT began airing on the WWE Network on February 27, 2014, with a live event called NXT Arrival.

NXT returned to cable on December 20, 2017, airing a 1-hour special on USA Network.

USA Network (2019–present)

In September 2019, NXT permanently moved to USA Network and was revamped as a live, two-hour program on Wednesday nights, with replays available the following day on WWE Network. Due to scheduling overlap with the final episodes of Suits, the second hour of the program was aired on WWE Network until October 2, when it began airing in its entirety on USA. This started the Wednesday Night Wars, during which NXT was broadcast in direct competition with rival wrestling show AEW Dynamite, which aired in the same time slot on TNT. Several publications noted the similarity between this ratings war and the Monday Night Wars that had involved Raw and WCW Monday Nitro.

Beginning with the March 18, 2020, episode of NXT, WWE began filming all of its programs without an audience at Full Sail University as a result of restrictions imposed amid the COVID-19 pandemic. On October 4, 2020, NXT relocated from Full Sail to the WWE Performance Center's main studio, which was reconfigured as the "Capitol Wrestling Center"; the studio was a variation of the WWE ThunderDomeconcept used by Raw and SmackDown since August, with a virtual audience and limited in-person audience.

With the end of Wednesday Night Wars, on April 13, 2021, following WrestleMania 37, WWE moved NXT back to Tuesday nights. After twelve NXT wrestlers were released from their contracts that August, Dave Scherer and Mike Johnson of Pro Wrestling Insider reported there had been internal talks of major changes to the brand, such as: "a new logo, new lighting, a focus on younger talents and a different format to the TV shows." Dave Meltzer reported that, after having lost the ratings war with AEW, NXT will likely go back to their developmental roots, with "talent that are younger, bigger and that could someday main event at WrestleMania." WWE President Nick Khan subsequently confirmed that NXT would undergo a "complete revamp" overseen by Triple H. However, due to undergoing heart surgery in September, Levesque stepped away from NXT with Shawn Michaels stepping in to oversee the changes. In September 2022, Michaels' role was made permanent, with his job title confirmed as Senior Vice President of Talent Development Creative, responsible for both creative and development at NXT.

At the conclusion of the September 13, 2022, edition of the show, the brand returned to the original NXT branding, revealing a revised version of the 2.0 logo in white with added gold accents and removing the "2.0".

Although Variety reported in 2021 that WWE and NBCUniversal signed a multi-year deal to keep NXT on USA, Dave Meltzer reported that NXT's TV deal with NBCUniversal expires in September 2023 amidst the WWE's possible acquisition. This differs from its main roster programs of Raw and SmackDown which their TV deals expire in 2024.

Special episodes

Episodes

On-air personalities

Authority figures 

On August 24, 2011, Maryse underwent surgery for an abdominal hernia and was on medical leave from WWE, therefore Maryse's role as co-host ended. She would later be released from WWE on October 28 and would not return to NXT. A new co-host was never announced. Dusty Rhodes was named Interim NXT General Manager on June 20, 2012, which coincided with the rebranding of NXT into a full scale developmental promotion. On the August 29 episode (taped July 29) of NXT, Rhodes was noted as NXT Commissioner. On September 25, 2013, Triple H relieved Dusty Rhodes of his duties and replaced him with John Bradshaw Layfield. On November 25, 2015, the Raw lead commentator Michael Cole replaced William Regal as NXT General Manager while Regal was recovering from neck surgery.

Commentators 

 Notes
 Matt Striker became the alternate color commentator on NXT beginning  due to Regal's increased in-ring schedule (Regal would continue as commentator when he was not wrestling). This ended on the  episode of NXT when Regal would return as a full-time commentator.
   Michael Cole served as special guest color commentator on NXT for the  broadcast substituting for an absent William Regal. Cole would also substitute for Regal again on commentary on the  broadcast due to Regal and Striker competing in a match that night.
  Matt Striker and Josh Mathews were guest commentators on NXT for the  broadcast substituting for the absent William Regal and Jack Korpela. Striker and Mathews returned to commentary the following two weeks because Jack Korpela's contract with the WWE had expired and he opted not to renew.
  Matt Striker and William Regal commentated the  episode of NXT due to Mathews being absent.
  Following the absence of Josh Mathews from NXT after being attacked by Brock Lesnar on the  episode of Raw, Matt Striker was joined by several guest commentators for one night on NXT: Hornswoggle, AJ Lee, and Michael McGillicutty.
  On the  episode of NXT, Josh Mathews was substituting for an absent Todd Grisham.
  Jim Ross only called the main event.
  The pairings of Dawson/Luftman (Dawson and Luftman were the same man) and Regal and Phillips and Maddox commentate on alternate shows. Riley replaced Maddox in August 2013 after Maddox became the Raw General Manager. Scott Stanford serves as narrator.
  When McGuinness was feeling under the weather, so only Ranallo and Watson called the event.
  When McGuinness was absent for the birth of his daughter, so only Ranallo and Watson called the event.
  On the  Christmas episode of NXT, Ranallo/McGuinness called some of the show from Full Sail, While Phillips/Phoenix called the other half from Brooklyn.

Ring announcers 

(*) If Chimel was absent from the NXT/SmackDown tapings, he would have been substituted as ring announcer by Raw’s Justin Roberts or Superstars’ Eden Stiles, who would also serve as SmackDown’s ring announcer for that week's episode. Effective December 8, 2011, Chimel has been replaced by Lilian Garcia on SmackDown and Eden Stiles has picked up Chimel's NXT announcing duties until December 13, 2011. On December 21 prior to NXT being uploaded on WWE.com, Stiles announced that she asked for her release from WWE a day after her final Superstars and NXT appearances had been recorded.

Production
In its original incarnation, the American Bang song "Wild and Young" had been used for each season with the exception of the third. During season three, the show's opening theme song was "You Make the Rain Fall" by Kevin Rudolf. "Get Thru This" by Art of Dying was also used as bumper music during the initial five seasons of the show. NXT, as a game show, were held in large arenas as a part of the taping schedules of WWE's other shows which featured the ring ropes yellow and used the same HD set used by WWE's other weekly programs.

Upon its reboot and arrival at Full Sail University, "Welcome Home" by Coheed and Cambria was used from the show's relaunch on June 20, 2012 to February 24, 2014 but it retains the yellow ropes and used the black mat. "Roar of the Crowd" by CFO$ served as the official theme song for NXT since its arrival to the WWE Network from (February 27, 2014) to April 5, 2017. A remix of the same song was used starting on June 15, 2016. From April 12, 2017, the theme song was "Rage" by CFO$, followed by "Resistance" by Powerflo; which was first used on the May 31, 2017 episode.

On the April 4, 2019 episode, "All Out Life" by Slipknot was used as the new theme song.

From April 20, 2021 to September 7, 2021, the official theme song for NXT was "Say Cheese" by Poppy, first performed at NXT TakeOver: Stand & Deliver.

When NXT was relaunched as NXT 2.0 on September 14, 2021, the official theme song is "Down South" by Wale featuring Yella Beezy & Maxo Kream. The new set features multicolored LED screens with an arch. The ring mat turned white and the ring ropes became white before turning blue and the announce table was repositioned. After NXT 2.0 was reverted to NXT, the ring ropes were reverted to white and the logo became white with black and gold accents in October 2022.

Broadcast history

International broadcasts
WWE NXT broadcasts in the United Kingdom on BT Sport since January 2020.

In the Arab world, NXT episodes are added on Shahid streaming platform a day after the live broadcast on USA Network.

See also 

 WWE Performance Center, WWE's training facility, which is close to Full Sail University.
 Wednesday Night Wars

References

Notes

External links 
 
 

 
2010 American television series debuts
2010 web series debuts
2020s American television series
Syfy original programming
NXT
NXT
American non-fiction web series
USA Network original programming
Hulu original programming
Wrestling Observer Newsletter award winners